Saigon Buffalo is a Vietnamese professional League of Legends team competing in the Vietnam Championship Series (VCS). The team has been crowned VCS champions twice, and qualified for the World Championship in 2017, 2018, and 2022, as well as the Mid-Season Invitational in 2019 and 2022.

History 

On 18 May 2018, Young Generation rebranded to Phong Vũ Buffalo after agreeing to a sponsorship deal with Phong Vũ, a major computer company in Vietnam. The team dominated in its first split in the VCS, losing only one series to EVOS Esports and one to GIGABYTE Marines, ending with a series record of 12 wins and 2 losses in the 2018 VCS Summer Split. This placement secured them a spot in finals of the VCS 2018 Summer Playoffs, where they defeated Cube Adonis 3–1 and qualified for the 2018 World Championship.

Because of EVOS Esports' placement at the 2018 Mid-Season Invitational, Vietnam was given a spot in the main event at the 2018 League of Legends World Championship, allowing Phong Vũ Buffalo to avoid the need to qualify through the play-in stage. For the group stage, Phong Vũ Buffalo was drawn into Group A, along with the Afreeca Freecs, the Flash Wolves, and G2 Esports. The team ended the group stage with 2 win and 4 losses, failing to qualify for the knockout stage.

Phong Vũ Buffalo placed 1st in the 2019 VCS Spring Split regular season, with a record of 13 wins and 1 loss. This directly qualified the team for the finals, where they defeated EVOS Esports 3–1 to qualify for the 2019 Mid-Season Invitational as Vietnam's representative.

Phong Vũ Buffalo was placed in Group A of the first round of the 2019 Mid-Season Invitational play-in stage, along with Turkish team 1907 Fenerbahçe, Australian team Bombers, and Argentine team Isurus Gaming. The team ended the group round robin with a record of 4 wins and 2 losses, tying 1907 Fenerbahçe for 1st and forcing a tiebreaker match, which 1907 Fenerbahçe lost. Phong Vũ Buffalo's victory qualified them for the second round of the play-in stage, where they lost 0–3 to Team Liquid. This result forced Phong Vũ Buffalo to play in a third round against Vega Squadron, who they defeated 3–2 in a close series, securing themselves a spot in the main event. Phong Vũ Buffalo placed last in the group stage of the main event with a 2–8 record, failing to advance to the knock-out stage.

On 31 May 2019, the organization announced it was renaming to Dashing Buffalo to reflect a change in its sponsorship, with Dashing Shampoo becoming its primary sponsor.

Dashing Buffalo renamed to Saigon Buffalo on 26 May 2020 to reflect its partnership with the Saigon Heat.

In November 2022, the South Korean esports-focused think tank JUEGO signed a deal to acquire Saigon Buffalo, but the deal fell through.

Current roster

Tournament results

Notes

References

External links 
 

2016 establishments in Vietnam
Esports teams established in 2016
Esports teams based in Vietnam
Vietnam Championship Series teams